Elizabeth Bradley (20 May 1922 – 30 October 2000) was an English actress, perhaps most famous for playing battle-axe Maud Grimes in the fictional soap Coronation Street.

Early life
Bradley was born Joan Abraham in Macclesfield, Cheshire, the daughter of a senior civil servant, and took her father's middle name as her stage surname. She started acting professionally at the age of 23.

Bradley's most famous role was as wheelchair-using pensioner Maud Grimes in Coronation Street, from 1993 to 1999. The character was sometimes called "the mother-in-law from hell". She filmed 476 episodes during this time. Bradley had previously played character Councillor Adams in the soap in 1978, but was credited then as Margaret Bradley.

She has also made TV appearances in London's Burning, The Bill, Casualty, Bad Girls and The Sweeney. Her film roles included Four Dimensions of Greta and The Flesh and Blood Show (both 1972) with director Pete Walker, and as the old woman who encounters a naked David Naughton at London Zoo in An American Werewolf in London (1981).

She was also a successful theatre actress, obtaining an Olivier Award nomination as Best Supporting Actress for her role in a National Theatre production of Billy Liar.

Personal life and death
Bradley married actor Garth Adams in 1950, and was so until his death in 1977 - they had three children. She died after suffering a stroke, at the age of 78.

Filmography

References

External links

1922 births
2000 deaths
English film actresses
English soap opera actresses
English television actresses
People from Hampstead
Actresses from London
20th-century English actresses